Anastasiya Novosad (born 8 May 1993) is a Ukrainian freestyle skier, specializing in aerials. She represented Ukraine at the 2014 Winter Olympics.

Career
Novosad started her international career in 2010 when she debuted at the European Cup and finished 6th in Minsk. She competed at two Junior World Championships, finishing 7th in 2012 and winning a silver medal in 2013.

Novosad made her World Cup debut on January 15, 2012, in Mont Garibel, Canada, where she finished 12th. Her first victory, which also was her first individual World Cup podium, came on December 10, 2021, in Ruka, Finland. It was also the first World Cup event when two Ukrainian female athletes finished in Top-3 (Olha Polyuk was 3rd).

Novosad competed at the 2014 Winter Olympics for Ukraine, finishing 16th.

She missed two seasons (2017-18 and 2018-19) because of pregnancy, so she was not able to qualify for the 2018 Winter Olympics. She successfully returned at the beginning of the 2019-20 season, finishing 3rd at the European Cup stage.

In 2022, Anastasiya Novosad was nominated for her second Winter Games in Beijing. However, she was barred from competitions due to positive COVID-19 tests.

Career results

Winter Olympics

World Championships

World Cup

Individual podiums

Team podiums

Individual rankings

European Cup

Individual podiums

References

External links

1993 births
Living people
Sportspeople from Rivne
Olympic freestyle skiers of Ukraine
Ukrainian female freestyle skiers
Freestyle skiers at the 2014 Winter Olympics